The Murray Valley Football Netball League is an Australian rules football League located in South Australia's Riverland region. The league features clubs from the smaller towns of the Riverland and Upper-Murray region. The league was previously known as Riverland Independent Football League but change its name at the end of 2022 with the admittance of Murrayville from Victoria.

Origins
The origins of this league came in 1909 when Lyrup, Renmark Town and Fairview Rovers founded the Murray Football Association. The Lyrup (then Saints, Now Lions) won the first ever premiership.

The competition reformed in 1919 as the Upper Murray Football Association and in 1923 split into A and B grade competitions. In 1952 the Association became the Upper Murray Football League, the same name as the Upper Murray Football League based around Corryong, Victoria.

The league's A Grade changed its name in 1972 to the Riverland Football League, with the B Grade changing its name to Riverland Independent Football League.

Ramco joined the RIFL in 2009 from the Mid Murray Football Association, as did Blanchetown/Swan Reach in 2010, and the MMFA disbanded.

At the conclusion of the 2022 season Mallee Football League disbanded and Murrayville applied for admittance to the competition

Current clubs

Former Clubs

Premiers

1971	Moorook-Kingston	11	14	80	Def	Browns Well	10	16	76
1972	Browns Well	11	12	78	Def	Paringa	7	10	52
1973	Lyrup	15	13	103	Def	Moorook-Kingston	11	9	75
1974	Wunkar	10	13	73	Def	Browns Well	8	14	62
1975	Browns Well	11	7	73	Def	Wunkar	9	17	71
1976	Wunkar	13	13	91	Def	Moorook-Kingston	9	10	64
1977	Moorook-Kingston	18	11	119	Def	Wunkar	9	13	67
1978	Browns Well	13	7	85	Def	Wunkar	11	8	74
1979	Paringa	16	15	111	Def	Gerard	9	13	67
1980	Lyrup	11	12	78	Def	Paringa	10	14	74
1981	Cobdogla	14	17	101	Def	Paringa	5	17	47
1982	Browns Well	13	11	89	Def	Paringa	10	15	75
1983	Moorook-Kingston	14	7	91	Def	Browns Well	10	10	70
1984	Cobdogla	14	18	102	Def	Browns Well	9	11	65
1985	Browns Well	25	18	168	Def	Cobdogla	6	4	40
1986	Browns Well	22	9	141	Def	Paringa	11	6	72
1987	Cobdogla	18	14	122	Def	Paringa	8	13	61
1988	Browns Well	7	10	52	Def	Paringa	6	7	43
1989	Cobdogla	9	12	66	Def	Browns Well	7	10	52
1990	Browns Well	13	10	88	Def	Cobdogla	12	15	87
1991	Cobdogla	12	14	86	Def	Wunkar	8	4	52
1992	Moorook-Kingston	15	10	100	Def	Cobdogla	14	15	99
1993	Moorook-Kingston	21	18	144	Def	Lyrup	14	12	96
1994	Moorook-Kingston	13	10	88	Def	East Murray	13	9	87
1995	Paringa	11	14	80	Def	Browns Well	7	16	58
1996	Lyrup	18	13	121	Def	Paringa	11	15	81
1997	Paringa	26	20	176	Def	Browns Well	10	13	73
1998	Cobdogla	21	16	142	Def	Wunkar	9	10	64
1999	Cobdogla	17	9	111	Def	East Murray	16	8	104
2000	Browns Well	10	15	75	Def	Wunkar	8	5	53
2001	Lyrup	7	9	51	Def	Cobdogla	7	8	50
2002	Paringa	12	11	83	Def	Lyrup	6	7	43
2003	East Murray	18	7	115	Def	Moorook-Kingston	10	4	64
2004	Lyrup	18	10	118	Def	Moorook-Kingston	9	6	60
2005	Paringa	14	15	 9	Def	Cobdogla	12	12	84
2006	Cobdogla	13	16	94	Def	Paringa	5	8	38
2007	Cobdogla	18	16	124	Def	Lyrup	12	11	83
2008	Cobdogla	18	14	122	Def	Lyrup	5	7	37
2009   Paringa         18      14      122     Def     Wunkar  17      12      114
2010   Lyrup           13       9      87      Def     East Murray     7       17      59
2011   Lyrup           13       5      83      Def     Paringa         8       4       52
2012   Blanchetown/SR  16      11      107     Def     Ramco           6       8       44
2013   Paringa         19      13      127     Def     Blanchetown/SR  19      10     124
2014   Moorook-Kingston 12     11      83      Def     Blanchetown/SR   8      9       57
2015   Lyrup           15      16      106     Def     Browns Well     11      14      80
2016   Browns Well     19       8      122     Def     Ramco            8       5      53
2017   Browns Well     10       8      68      Def     Paringa          5       9      39
2018   Paringa         9        8      62      Def     Sedan-Cambrai    8      12      60
2019   Sedan-Cambrai   17       6      108     Def     Paringa          6      10      46
2021   Ramco           6        7      43      Def     Sedan-Cambrai    4      10      34
2022   Blanchtown/SR   10       8      68      Def     Sedan-Cambrai    8      6       54

2013 Ladder

2014 Ladder

2015 Ladder

2016 Ladder

2017 Ladder

2018 Ladder

References

Books
 Encyclopedia of South Australian country football clubs / compiled by Peter Lines. 
 South Australian country football digest / by Peter Lines

External links
 Fox Sports Pulse RFL Site
 Country footy Riverland footy news
 SANFL Affiliated Leagues 2006
 RFL League Website

Australian rules football competitions in South Australia
Riverland